The Seneca effect, or Seneca cliff or Seneca collapse, is a mathematical model proposed by Ugo Bardi to describe situations where a system's rate of decline is much sharper than its earlier rate of growth.

Description 
In 2017, Bardi published a book titled The Seneca Effect: When Growth is Slow but Collapse is Rapid, named as the Roman philosopher and writer Seneca, who wrote Fortune is of sluggish growth, but ruin is rapid (Letters to Lucilius, 91.6):

Bardi's book looked at cases of rapid decline across societies (including the fall of empires, financial crises, and major famines), in nature (including avalanches), and through man-made systems (including cracks in metal objects). Bardi concluded that rapid collapse is not a flaw, or "bug" as he terms it, but a "varied and ubiquitous phenomena" with multiple causes and resultant pathways. The collapse of a system can often clear the path for new, and better adapted, structures.  In a 2019 book titled Before the Collapse: A Guide to the Other Side of Growth, Bardi describes a "Seneca Rebound" that often takes place where new systems replace the collapsed system, and often at a rate faster than preceding growth rates as the collapse has eliminated many of impediments or constraints from the previous system.

The "Seneca effect" model is related to the "World3" model from the 1972 report The Limits to Growth, issued by the Club of Rome.

Use
One of the model's main practical applications has been to describe the resultant outcomes given the condition of a global shortage of fossil fuels.  Unlike the symmetrical Hubbert curve fossil fuel model, the Seneca cliff model shows material asymmetry, where the global rate of decline in fossil fuel production is far steeper than forecasted by the Hubbert curve.

The term has also been used to describe rapid declines in businesses that had grown for decades, with the rapid post-2005 decline and resultant bankruptcy in Kodak as an quoted example.

See also
 Hubbert curve
 Societal collapse
 Joseph Tainter

References 

https://books.google.ca/books/about/The_Seneca_Effect.html?id=F14yDwAAQBAJ&printsec=frontcover&source=kp_read_button&redir_esc=y

Further reading 
 
  
  
 
 Jackson, Tim and Robin Webster. "Limits to Growth revisited." Reframing Global Social Policy: Social Investment for Sustainable and Inclusive Growth (2017): 295.
 Novak, Peter. "Sustainable energy system with zero emissions of GHG for cities and countries." Energy and Buildings 98 (2015): 27-33.
 Illig, Aude, and Ian Schindler. "Oil Extraction, Economic Growth, and Oil Price Dynamics." BioPhysical Economics and Resource Quality 2.1 (2017): 1.

External links 
 

Equations
Economics curves
Resource economics
Peak oil
Continuous distributions
Seneca the Younger